Raja Chanda is an Indian film director who concentrates into Bengali language film and commercial ad films. He is one of the leading advertising film makers in Kolkata and has made 450+ ad films. His filmworks include Challenge 2, Le Halua Le, Rangbaaz, Savings Account, Magic (2021 film)  and Target: The Final Mission.

Filmography

As director

As lyricist(s)

References

External links
 
 

Film directors from West Bengal
Living people
Bengali film directors
21st-century Indian film directors
1973 births